Mariah Duran (born December 14, 1996) is a goofy-footed American skateboarder.

Skateboarding
Duran entered her first skateboarding competition at the age of 13 in her hometown of Albuquerque.

In 2016, Duran went Pro for Meow Skateboards, joining then Meow team members Leo Baker, Vanessa Torres, Adrianne Sloboh, and others.

In 2018, Duran won her first Gold medal at X Games Minneapolis in the women’s skateboarding street competition.

Duran was among the 16 members of the inaugural U.S.A Skateboarding National Team announced in March, 2019. Duran competed to qualify for the 2020 Tokyo Olympic Games in the Women's Street division. On June 21, 2021, Duran was announced as part of the inaugural U.S. Olympic skateboarding team by USA Skateboarding. At the Olympics, she competed in the Women's street event. She finished 13th in the preliminary round, which was not high enough to advance to the 8-person final.

References

External links
Skate Girls: Mariah Duran

1996 births
Living people
American skateboarders
American sportswomen
Female skateboarders
Olympic skateboarders of the United States
Skateboarders at the 2020 Summer Olympics
Sportspeople from Albuquerque, New Mexico
X Games athletes
21st-century American women